The 2012 President's Cup was a professional tennis tournament played on outdoor hard courts. It was the sixth edition of the tournament for men and the 4th edition for women, and is part of the 2012 ATP Challenger Tour and the 2012 ITF Women's Circuit. It took place in Astana, Kazakhstan between 23 and 29 July 2012.

ATP singles main-draw entrants

Seeds

 1 Rankings are as of July 16, 2012.

Other entrants
The following players received wildcards into the singles main draw:
  Alexey Kedryuk
  Serizhan Yessenbekov
  Denis Yevseyev

The following players received entry from the qualifying draw:
  Sarvar Ikramov
  Dzmitry Zhyrmont
  Tal Eros
  Yaraslav Shyla

The following players received entry as a lucky loser:
  Daniiar Duldaev

WTA singles  main-draw entrants

Seeds

 Rankings are as of July 16, 2012.

Other entrants
The following players received wildcards into the singles main draw:
  Anna Danilina
  Ekaterina Klyueva
  Anastasiya Yepisheva

The following players received entry from the qualifying draw:
  Luksika Kumkhum
  Ksenia Lykina
  Sofia Shapatava
  Sun Shengnan

The following players received entry by a lucky loser spot:
  Alexandra Artamonova
  Paula Kania
  Nadiia Kichenok
  Sviatlana Pirazhenka

Champions

Men's singles

 Evgeny Donskoy def.  Marsel İlhan, 6–3, 6–4

Women's singles

 Maria João Koehler def.  Marta Sirotkina, 7–5, 6–2

Men's doubles

 Konstantin Kravchuk /  Denys Molchanov def.  Karol Beck /  Kamil Čapkovič, 6–4, 6–3

Women's doubles

 Oksana Kalashnikova /  Marta Sirotkina def.  Lyudmyla Kichenok /  Nadiia Kichenok, 3–6, 6–4, [10–2]

External links
Official website

President's Cup
President's Cup
President's Cup (tennis)